Jawdat is a male given name. Notable people with the name include:

 Ali Jawdat al-Aiyubi (1886–1969), Iraqi politician
 Jawdat Ibrahim, Israeli-Arab businessman
 Jawdat Said (1931–2022), Syrian Islamic scholar

Arabic masculine given names